James H. Brickley (November 15, 1928 – September 28, 2001) was an American judge and politician who served as the 56th and 58th lieutenant governor of Michigan and a justice of the Michigan Supreme Court from 1982 to 1999.  He was a member of the Republican Party.

Biography
Brickley was born in Flint, Michigan.  He received his baccalaureate and law degree from the University of Detroit and then obtain a Master of Laws degree from New York University.

Brickley served as United States Attorney for the Eastern District of Michigan.  He was Lieutenant Governor of Michigan from 1971 to 1974 and again from 1979 to 1982 under Governor William Milliken. From 1975 until 1978 he was president of Eastern Michigan University. Brickley was appointed to the Michigan Supreme Court in December 1982 to replace retiring justice Mary S. Coleman. From 1995 to 1996 Brickley was the chief justice of the Michigan Supreme Court.  He retired from the bench in October 1999 and Governor John Engler appointed United States Attorney Stephen Markman to replace him.

He died in Traverse City, Michigan in 2001.

Notes

1928 births
2001 deaths
Chief Justices of the Michigan Supreme Court
Detroit City Council members
Lieutenant Governors of Michigan
Michigan Republicans
New York University School of Law alumni
Politicians from Flint, Michigan
Presidents of Eastern Michigan University
United States Attorneys for the Eastern District of Michigan
University of Detroit Mercy alumni
20th-century American judges
20th-century American politicians
Justices of the Michigan Supreme Court
20th-century American academics